Salt Lake City International Airport  is a civil-military airport located about  west of Downtown Salt Lake City, Utah, in the United States. The airport is the closest commercial airport for more than 2.5 million people and is within a 30-minute drive of nearly 1.3 million jobs. The airport serves as a hub for Delta Air Lines and is a major gateway to the Intermountain West and West Coast. The airport sees 343 scheduled nonstop airline departures per day to 93 cities in North America and Europe. It is by far the busiest airport in Utah, and the only one with significant passenger traffic.

Salt Lake City International Airport continues to rank high for on-time departures/arrivals and fewest flight cancellations among major US airports. The airport ranked first for on time departures and arrivals and first for percentage of cancellations as of April 2017. The airport is owned by the City of Salt Lake City and is administered by the municipal Department of Airports.

History

1900 to 1940
In 1911, a site for an air field was chosen on Basque Flats, named for Spanish-French sheep herders who worked the fields in the then-desolate area of the Salt Lake Valley, where a cinder-covered landing was subsequently created. The Great International Aviation Carnival was held the same year and brought aviation pioneers representing Curtiss Aeroplane and Motor Company and a team representing the Wright Brothers to Salt Lake City. World-famous aviator Glenn H. Curtiss brought his newly invented Seaplane to the carnival, a type of airplane that had never been demonstrated to the public. Curtiss took off from the nearby Great Salt Lake, awing the 20,000 spectators and making international headlines.

For several years, the new field was used mainly for training and aerobatic flights. That would change in 1920 when the United States Postal Service (USPS) began air mail service to Salt Lake City. The city bought a 100-acre tract around Basque Flats for $4,000 and built a field, hangar and other facilities. In the same year, the airfield was given the name Woodward Field, named for John P. Woodward, a local aviator. The first transcontinental air mail flight landed at Woodward Field on September 8.

In 1925, the postal service began awarding contracts to private companies. Western Air Express, the first private company to carry U.S. mail, began flying from Salt Lake City to Los Angeles via Las Vegas. Less than a year later Western Air Express would begin flying passengers along the same route. Western Air Express later became Western Airlines, which had a large hub in Salt Lake City.

Charles Lindbergh visited Woodward Field in 1927, drawing many spectators to see The Spirit of St. Louis. In 1930 the airport was renamed Salt Lake City Municipal Airport.

The first terminal and airport administration building was built in 1933 at a cost of $52,000. By then, United Airlines had begun serving Salt Lake City on flights between New York City and San Francisco.

As air travel became more popular and the United States Army Air Forces established a base at the airport during World War II, a third runway was added (Runway diagram for 1955). The April 1957 Official Airline Guide (now OAG) shows 42 weekday departures: 18 on Western, 17 United and 7 Frontier. United had flown nonstop to Chicago since 1950, but nonstop service to New York did not start until 1968. The first jets were United 720s in September 1960.

1960 terminal
A new terminal was needed and work began on the west side of the airport on Terminal 1, designed by Brazier Montmorency Hayes & Talbot and dedicated in 1960 after seven years of work and a cost of $8 million. In 1968, the airport became Salt Lake City International Airport when a non-stop route to Calgary, Canada was awarded to Western Airlines.

After airline deregulation in 1978, hub airports appeared. Western Airlines, with ties to Salt Lake City since its inception, chose the airport as one of its hubs.

Terminal 2 was designed by Montmorency Hayes & Talbot and built solely for Western and had several murals by artist LeConte Stewart.

During the 1980s, the airport saw further expansion to both terminals as well as runway extension. In 1987, Western Airlines merged with Delta Air Lines. Salt Lake City would continue to be a major airline hub for Delta.

In 1991, the airport opened a new short-term parking garage. The airport opened a new runway in 1995 along with the International Terminal and E concourse for SkyWest Airlines, which was designed by Gensler. A new  control tower, new approach control facility, and a new fire station were opened in 1999.

In 2001, Concourse E was expanded for additional gates and SkyWest Airlines opened its new maintenance hangar and training facility. In 2002, the airport saw heavy crowds as Salt Lake City welcomed over one million visitors for the Winter Olympics.

Expanded airline service
In June 2008, Delta Air Lines began daily nonstop service to Paris–Charles de Gaulle. This marked the first scheduled transatlantic route from Salt Lake City. In November 2008, Delta announced nonstop service to Narita International Airport near Tokyo, Japan, mostly as a result of Delta's merger with Northwest Airlines. The service began on June 3, 2009, the first nonstop from Salt Lake City to Asia. Between 2010 and 2011, the flights to Tokyo were seasonal, May to October. Delta has not operated the flight since October 2011.

On May 5, 2016, KLM began new, twice weekly nonstop service from Salt Lake City to Amsterdam, and increased service to three times weekly on July 4, 2016. It is the first transatlantic route from Salt Lake City served by a European-based airline. The service is intended to supplement the existing daily flight between Salt Lake City and Amsterdam operated by Air France KLM's Transatlantic Joint Venture partner Delta Air Lines.

New terminal

The Airport Redevelopment Program broke ground in 2014, initiating construction of the New SLC terminal complex. This began the process of replacing the existing, aging facilities with all new facilities, including a rental car facility, a parking garage, a consolidated terminal, two linear concourses (similar to Washington Dulles International Airport) with 93 gates, two tunnels, and an elevated roadway. The construction was funded by airport funds, passenger and customer facility charges, bonds, and federal grants.

The Airport opened Phase 1 of the new terminal in 2020. This consisted of concourse A, which opened with 25 gates while Concourse B opened with 21 gates. The concourses are connected by a mid-field underground tunnel. After Concourse B opened, the old terminals and concourses were closed and demolition began. Once the old complex is demolished, Concourse A and B east will be built. Phase 2 is expected to be completed by December 2024. With the opening of the new airport, Delta Air Lines opened its brand new Sky Club in concourse A, which until then was the largest in their network.

Facilities
The runways are generally oriented in a NNW/SSE magnetic direction due to consistent prevailing winds in this direction.

Terminal
SLC has a single terminal with two concourses connected by an underground tunnel for a total of 46 gates. There is a single security check point with 16 lanes and eight baggage carousels.

 Concourse A has 25 gates, with 22 more opening.
 Concourse B has 21 gates, with eight more opening.

Ground transportation
The airport is accessible from I-80 at exit 115 B or from I-215 at exits 22 and 22 B, with the GA terminal accessible from I-215 exit 23 The airport can also be accessed from North Temple Street and Utah State Route 154 (Bangerter Highway), both of which terminate and merge into the airport's Terminal Drive.

Rail and bus services that connect the surrounding region to Salt Lake City International Airport include TRAX light rail service from the Airport station, UTA bus service, and FrontRunner commuter rail (via TRAX).

Ground transportation is available from the airport to ski resorts and locations throughout Salt Lake, Davis, Weber, Utah, and Summit counties. Many Salt Lake taxis, limousines, and shuttles accommodate ski equipment.

Cargo operations
The airport handled 156,319 metric tonnes of cargo in 2008.

General aviation

Despite being the 28th busiest airport in the world in terms of aircraft operations, the airport still maintains a large general aviation presence. In 2008, 19% of aircraft movements at the airport came from general aviation traffic. This is in contrast to most large airports, which encourage general aviation aircraft to use smaller or less busy airports in order to prevent delays to commercial traffic. The airport is able to effectively handle both commercial and general aviation traffic largely in part to the airport's layout and airspace structure. Nearly all general aviation operations are conducted on the east side of the airport, away from commercial traffic. Additionally, smaller and relatively slower general aviation aircraft arrive and depart the airport in ways that generally do not hinder the normal flow of arriving or departing commercial aircraft.

2019 data shows that there are 331 general aviation aircraft based at the airport. The airport has three fixed-base operators; TAC Air, Atlantic Aviation, and Menzies Aviation located on the east side of the airport. The airport has facilities for air ambulance, law enforcement, as well as state and federal government aircraft. Additionally, the airport is home to several flight training facilities, including one operated by Westminster College.

Military operations
The Utah Air National Guard operates what was previously named the Salt Lake City Air National Guard Base on the east side of the airport. In November 2014, the installation was renamed the Roland R. Wright Air National Guard Base after Brigadier General Roland R. Wright, USAF (Ret).

The base occupies approximately 140 acres as a U.S. Government cantonment area leased from the airport. In addition to flight line, the installation comprises 65 buildings: 3 services, 13 administrative, and 47 industrial. There are 255 full-time Air Reserve Technician and Active Guard and Reserve personnel assigned, augmented by 1,343 part-time traditional air national guardsmen. The host wing for the installation is the 151st Air Refueling Wing (151 ARW), an Air Mobility Command (AMC)-gained unit operating the KC-135R Stratotanker.

Airlines and destinations

Passenger

Cargo

Statistics

Passenger numbers

Top destinations

Airline market share

Accidents and incidents

 On May 1, 1942, United Airlines Trip 4, a Douglas DC-3 impacted the side of a hill after deviating off course  NE of Salt Lake Municipal Airport, all 17 on board were killed.
 On January 17, 1963, a West Coast Airlines Fairchild F-27 on a training flight out and back to SLC crashed west of the airport into Great Salt Lake simulating an emergency descent, all three occupants perished.
 On November 11, 1965, United Airlines Flight 227, operated with a Boeing 727, crashed just short of the runway at Salt Lake City International Airport (then named Salt Lake City Municipal Airport), killing 43 of the 91 people on board.
 On December 16, 1969, an Aero Commander 1121 Jet Commander operated by American Smelting and Refining Co. lifted off prematurely, stalled and crashed. Both occupants died.
 On December 17, 1977, United Airlines Flight 2860, a cargo flight operated with a Douglas DC-8 crashed into a mountain near Kaysville while in a holding pattern prior to landing at Salt Lake City International Airport. The crew was trying to figure out an electrical problem and did not realize they were adjacent to a mountain. All three people on board were killed in the accident.
 On January 15, 1987, Skywest Airlines Flight 1834, a Fairchild Metro, collided with a Mooney M20 at 7000 feet while the Metro was on a runway 34 approach. Both aircraft fell and crashed to the ground. All eight on the Metro and two on the Mooney were killed.
 On October 14, 1989, Delta Air Lines Flight 1554, operated with a Boeing 727, caught fire during the boarding process for a flight to Edmonton, Alberta, Canada while the aircraft was parked at a gate. Of the 22 people who were on the aircraft at the time, five sustained minor injuries. While all passengers and crew evacuated, the aircraft was destroyed. An investigation determined the fire started due to a malfunction with the passenger oxygen system.
One passenger out of the four on board died.
 On November 16, 2015, three days after the 2015 Paris terror attacks, an Air France Airbus A380 traveling from Los Angeles to Paris was diverted to Salt Lake City International Airport due to a bomb threat on the aircraft. The aircraft was the largest plane to ever land at the airport. The airport workers had only 15 minutes to get ready for the emergency landing.
 On January 18, 2016, two people died when their Cessna 525 private jet crashed shortly after take-off from Salt Lake City International on their way to Tucson International Airport in Tucson, Arizona. 
 On March 30, 2021, a chartered Delta Airlines Boeing 757 carrying the NBA's Utah Jazz to Memphis International Airport in Memphis, Tennessee for a game against the Memphis Grizzlies made an emergency landing at SLC after suffering a bird strike shortly after takeoff. The plane suffered damage to an engine but there were no injuries among its occupants.

In popular culture
In the 1974 film Airport 1975, Captain Alan Murdock (played by Charlton Heston) lands a crippled Boeing 747 at SLC which was involved in a midair collision with a Beechcraft Baron which crashed into the cockpit of the 747, killing most of the flight crew. After landing, the aircraft exited the runway but eventually came to a stop. The movie ends with an emergency evacuation of all passengers and crew at the airport. A good portion of the movie was filmed on location at SLC.

Other notable films with scenes shot on location at SLC:

 Dumb and Dumber (1994)
 Unaccompanied Minors (2006) 
 Waiting for Forever (2010)
 Darling Companion (2012)

See also

 Ogden-Hinckley Airport
 Provo Municipal Airport
 Spanish Fork Municipal Airport
 Heber Valley Airport
 South Valley Regional Airport
 St. George Regional Airport
 Utah World War II Army Airfields
 List of tallest air traffic control towers in the United States

References

External links

 
 
 
 

 
1911 establishments in Utah
Buildings and structures in Salt Lake City
Airports in Utah
Transportation in Salt Lake City
Airports established in 1911